Diane Arkenstone is a multi-genre musician.

Career 
Arkenstone, who grew up in California, wrote her first song at the age of three and started playing guitar at the age of seven. She is trained as an opera singer. In her early career, she co-formed the duo Enaid & Einalem with a friend named Melanie.

Her voice can be heard in the 2002 game Heroes of Might and Magic IV, in the tracks "A Wise Tale" and "Hope" (among many others) of the game's soundtrack. While her name is not in the credits of the game, her influence is noticeable throughout the soundtrack.

Arkenstone's album Jewel in the Sun debuted at number 16 on Billboard's New Age charts when it was released in 2002, highest position was number 11. In 2005, The Best of Diane Arkenstone was ranked No. 1 on Zone Music Reporter's Top 100 Airplay Chart, out of 2800 recordings reported that year.

In her career, she has done work on more than 55 albums and played various instruments such as guitar, keyboard, wood flutes, dulcimer, synthesizers and percussion.

Arkenstone created her own record label called Neo Pacifica Recordings. In addition to releasing her own music on the label, she included other bands such as Earth Trybe, Enaid, Ah Nee Mah and the Marquis Ensemble.

Her album Union Road was released in March of 2013, The Healing Heart released in 2021 and Avalon, Between Earth and Sky, with David Arkenstone, released in 2022.

Discography

Diane Arkenstone

She has also worked with David Arkenstone on the albums Music Inspired by Middle Earth, The Celtic Book of Days and the album Trance World from Earth Trybe. With Misha Segal and Peter Hume she worked on the 3-CD collaboration Christmas Healing.

Enaid and Einalem

Adventure Cargo

Ah Nee Mah

Earth Trybe

Enaid

The Marquis Ensemble

See also 
List of ambient music artists

References

External links 

New-age musicians
Living people
1975 births